The 2019 season was the 17th season of competitive kickboxing in Romania.

List of events

OSS Fighters 03

OSS Fighters 03 was a kickboxing event produced by the OSS Fighters that took place on February 28, 2019, at the Sala Polivalentă in Bucharest, Romania.

Results

Colosseum Tournament 11

Colosseum Tournament 11 was a kickboxing event produced by the Colosseum Tournament that took place on March 29, 2019 at the Sala Polivalentă in Bucharest, Romania.

Results

SNF 3

SNF 3 was a kickboxing event produced by the Supreme Night Fight that took place on March 31, 2019 at the Sala Sporturilor in Dej, Romania.

Results

Colosseum Tournament 12

Colosseum Tournament 12 was a kickboxing event produced by the Colosseum Tournament that took place on May 9, 2019 at the Sala Polivalentă in Arad, Romania.

Results

Urban Legend 7

Urban Legend 7 (also known as  Romania vs. Netherlands) was a kickboxing, mixed martial arts and boxing event produced by the Urban Legend in association with Superpro Sportcenter that took place on May 25, 2019 at the Sala Sporturilor in Constanța, Romania.

Results

KO Masters 3

KO Masters 3 was a kickboxing and bare-knuckle boxing event produced by the KO Masters that took place on June 3, 2019, at the Berăria H in Bucharest, Romania.

Results

Dynamite Fighting Show 4

Dynamite Fighting Show 4 (also known as  Moroșanu vs. Sam) was a kickboxing and professional boxing event produced by the Dynamite Fighting Show that took place on June 6, 2019 at the Sala Sporturilor Horia Demian in Cluj-Napoca, Romania. The event was sold out.

Results

Awards
Fight of the Night: Cătălin Moroșanu vs. Daniel Sam

SAS Gym 02

SAS Gym 02 was a kickboxing event produced by the SAS Gym that took place on June 13, 2019 at the Bamboo Club in Bucharest, Romania.

Results

Fight Zone 5

Fight Zone 5 was a kickboxing, boxing and mixed martial arts event produced by the Fight Zone that took place on June 16, 2019 at the Sala Sporturilor in Deva, Romania.

Results

Colosseum Tournament 13

Colosseum Tournament 13 was a kickboxing event produced by the Colosseum Tournament that took place on June 28, 2019 at the Sala Polivalentă in Călărași, Romania.

Results

Colosseum Tournament 14

Colosseum Tournament 14 was a kickboxing event produced by the Colosseum Tournament that took place on July 20, 2019 at the Sala Gabriel Udișteanu in Fălticeni, Romania.

Results

OSS Fighters 04

OSS Fighters 04 was a kickboxing event produced by the OSS Fighters that took place on August 22, 2019, at the Piațeta Cazino in Mamaia, Romania.

Results

KO Masters 4

KO Masters 4 was a kickboxing event produced by the KO Masters that took place on September 16, 2019, at the Berăria H in Bucharest, Romania.

Results

Colosseum Tournament 15

Colosseum Tournament 15 was a kickboxing event produced by the Colosseum Tournament that took place on September 22, 2019 at the Arena Antonio Alexe in Oradea, Romania.

Results

Dynamite Fighting Show 5

Dynamite Fighting Show 5 (also known as  Team Moroșanu vs. Team Bonjasky) was a kickboxing and mixed martial arts event produced by the Dynamite Fighting Show that took place on September 27, 2019 at the Sala Polivalentă in Piatra Neamț, Romania.

Results

Awards
Fight of the Night: Florin Lambagiu vs. Daniel Stefanovski

UFT 8

UFT 8 was a mixed martial arts and kickboxing event produced by the Ultimate Fighting Tournament  that took place on October 26, 2019 at the Sala Sporturilor Horia Demian in Cluj-Napoca.

Colosseum Tournament 16

Colosseum Tournament 16 was a kickboxing event produced by the Colosseum Tournament that took place on October 28, 2019 at the Sala Transilvania in Sibiu, Romania.

Results

KO Masters 5

KO Masters 5 was a kickboxing event produced by the KO Masters that took place on November 14, 2019, at the Berăria H in Bucharest, Romania.

Results

Dynamite Fighting Show 6

Dynamite Fighting Show 6 (also known as  David vs. Goliath) was a kickboxing and mixed martial arts event produced by the Dynamite Fighting Show that took place on November 21, 2019 at the Sala Polivalentă in Iași, Romania. The event was sold out.

Results

Awards
Fight of the Night: Cristian Ristea vs. Thomas Froschauer

KO Masters 6

KO Masters 6 was a kickboxing event produced by the KO Masters that took place on November 25, 2019, at the Berăria H in Bucharest, Romania.

Results

GFC 6

GFC 6 (also known as  Romania vs. Netherlands) was a kickboxing event produced by the Golden Fighter Championship that took place on November 29, 2019 at the Sala Constantin Jude in Timișoara, Romania.

Results

Colosseum Tournament 17

Colosseum Tournament 17 was a kickboxing event produced by the Colosseum Tournament that took place on December 1, 2019 at the Sala Polivalentă in Bucharest, Romania.

Results

Mix Kombat 5 

Mix Kombat 5 was a kickboxing event produced by the Mix Kombat that took place on December 7, 2019 at the Sala Polivalentă in Bistrița, Romania.

Results

Fight Zone 6

Fight Zone 6 was a kickboxing and boxing event produced by the Fight Zone that took place on December 20, 2019 at the Sala Sporturilor in Deva, Romania.

Results

See also
 2019 in Glory
 2019 in ONE Championship
 2019 in RXF

References

External links
 Dynamitefighting.com
 Colosseumkickboxing.com
 OSS Fighters on Facebook
 Golden Fighter Championship on Facebook
 KO Masters on Facebook

Kickboxing
2019 in kickboxing
2019 in mixed martial arts
Kickboxing in Romania